Cyana rejecta is a moth of the family Erebidae. It was described by Francis Walker in 1854. It is found in the Democratic Republic of the Congo, Ethiopia, Kenya, Malawi, Sierra Leone, South Africa, Tanzania, Gambia and Uganda.

References

Cyana
Moths described in 1854
Moths of Africa